Lancaster Steiner School is an independent coeducational school in Lancaster, England, with classes for nursery, kindergarten and grades 1–5. The curriculum is based on the principles of Waldorf education established by Rudolf Steiner. In a 2010 report from Ofsted, the teaching at Lancaster Steiner School was described by inspectors as "frequently outstanding".

Lancaster Steiner School is a member of the Steiner Waldorf Schools Fellowship and follows the Waldorf school curriculum. The school applied  to become a state-funded Steiner Primary School in 2014. The school had earlier applied for free school status in 2010.

References

External links
 

Schools in Lancaster, Lancashire
Waldorf schools in the United Kingdom
Private schools in Lancashire